The 1988–89 NBA season was the Bucks' 21st season in the NBA. It was the very first season for the Bucks playing in the Bradley Center, after the team moved there from the Milwaukee Arena, otherwise known as "The Mecca". During the off-season, the team acquired Fred Roberts from the expansion Miami Heat. The Bucks struggled with a 3–4 start to the season, but later on posted a six-game winning streak in January, and held a 30–15 record at the All-Star break. The team finished fourth in the Central Division with a 49–33 record. 

Terry Cummings averaged 22.9 points, 8.1 rebounds and 1.3 steals per game, and was named to the All-NBA Third Team, and selected for the 1989 NBA All-Star Game, while sixth man Ricky Pierce averaged 17.6 points per game off the bench, and Jack Sikma provided the team with 13.4 points and 7.8 rebounds per game. In addition, Larry Krystkowiak averaged 12.7 points and 7.6 rebounds per game, while Paul Pressey provided with 12.1 points, 6.6 assists and 1.8 steals per game, Sidney Moncrief also contributed 12.1 points per game, and Jay Humphries averaged 11.6 points, 5.5 assists and 1.9 steals per game.

In the Eastern Conference First Round of the playoffs, the Bucks lost Game 1 to the 4th-seeded Atlanta Hawks on the road, 100–92, but managed to beat them in five games. It marked the last time the Bucks would advance to the second round until 2000–01. In the Eastern Conference Semi-finals, the Bucks were swept by the eventual champions Detroit Pistons in four straight games. The Pistons would reach the NBA Finals for the second consecutive year, and defeat the defending champion Los Angeles Lakers in four straight games, winning their first ever championship.

Following the season, Cummings was traded to the San Antonio Spurs, and Moncrief retired after ten seasons with the Bucks. Shortly after the season began, team owner Herb Kohl was elected to the first of four terms representing the United States Senate in Wisconsin.

Draft picks

Roster

Regular season

Season standings

z - clinched division title
y - clinched division title
x - clinched playoff spot

Record vs. opponents

Game log

|-style="background:#fcc;"
| 2 || November 5, 1988 || Atlanta
| L 94–107
|Terry Cummings (19)
|Jack Sikma (10)
|Ricky Pierce (5)
| Bradley Center18,649
| 1–1
|-style="background:#bbffbb;"
| 3 || November 9, 1988 || Philadelphia
| W 114–103
|Terry Cummings (31)
|Larry Krystkowiak, Paul Pressey (7)
|Jay Humphries (6)
| Bradley Center14,192
| 2–1
|-style="background:#bbffbb;"
| 4 || November 12, 1988 || Boston
| W 108–100
|
|
|
| Bradley Center18,673
| 3–1

|-style="background:#fcc;"
| 21 || December 17, 1988 || Chicago
| L 93–112
|
|
|
| Bradley Center18,649
| 1–1
|-style="background:#bbffbb;"
| 24 || December 23, 1988 || Dallas
| W 113–101
|
|
|
| Bradley Center18,633
| 14–10

Playoffs

|- align="center" bgcolor="#ffcccc"
| 1
| April 27
| @ Atlanta
| L 92–100
| Jay Humphries (20)
| Terry Cummings (8)
| Sidney Moncrief (6)
| Omni Coliseum14,541
| 0–1
|- align="center" bgcolor="#ccffcc"
| 2
| April 29
| @ Atlanta
| W 108–98
| Terry Cummings (22)
| Terry Cummings (8)
| Jack Sikma (7)
| Omni Coliseum15,742
| 1–1
|- align="center" bgcolor="#ccffcc"
| 3
| May 2
| Atlanta
| W 117–113 (OT)
| Ricky Pierce (35)
| Terry Cummings (14)
| Jay Humphries (10)
| Bradley Center18,469
| 2–1
|- align="center" bgcolor="#ffcccc"
| 4
| May 5
| Atlanta
| L 106–113 (OT)
| Jack Sikma (24)
| Larry Krystkowiak (10)
| Jay Humphries (15)
| Bradley Center18,633
| 2–2
|- align="center" bgcolor="#ccffcc"
| 5
| May 7
| @ Atlanta
| W 96–92
| Ricky Pierce (25)
| Jack Sikma (9)
| Jay Humphries (5)
| Omni Coliseum16,220
| 3–2
|-

|- align="center" bgcolor="#ffcccc"
| 1
| May 10
| @ Detroit
| L 80–85
| Ricky Pierce (25)
| Sidney Moncrief (6)
| Jay Humphries (6)
| The Palace of Auburn Hills21,454
| 0–1
|- align="center" bgcolor="#ffcccc"
| 2
| May 12
| @ Detroit
| L 92–112
| Krystkowiak, Pierce (22)
| Larry Krystkowiak (13)
| Rickey Green (6)
| The Palace of Auburn Hills21,454
| 0–2
|- align="center" bgcolor="#ffcccc"
| 3
| May 14
| Detroit
| L 90–110
| Ricky Pierce (22)
| Randy Breuer (8)
| Jay Humphries (5)
| Bradley Center18,633
| 0–3
|- align="center" bgcolor="#ffcccc"
| 4
| May 15
| Detroit
| L 94–96
| Fred Roberts (33)
| Randy Breuer (9)
| Jay Humphries (14)
| Bradley Center18,633
| 0–4
|-

Player statistics

Season

Player Stats Citation:

Playoffs

Awards and records
 Terry Cummings, All-NBA Third Team

Transactions

Trades

Free Agents

Player Transactions Citation:

See also
 1988-89 NBA season

References

Milwaukee Bucks seasons
Milwaukee
Milwaukee Bucks
Milwaukee Bucks